Sir William John Brabazon, 2nd Baronet (16 September 1778 - 24 October 1840), was an Irish Member of Parliament.

Brabazon was born in County Mayo and educated at Trinity College, Dublin.  He succeeded as second Baronet, of Newpark in County Mayo, on 3 July 1803. On 24 January 1835 he was elected one of the Members of Parliament for Mayo in the United Kingdom House of Commons, serving until 1840. On his death the baronetcy became extinct.

References

External links 
 

1778 births
1840 deaths
Baronets in the Baronetage of Ireland
William
19th-century Anglo-Irish people
Irish people of Norman descent
Members of the Parliament of the United Kingdom for County Mayo constituencies (1801–1922)
UK MPs 1835–1837
UK MPs 1837–1841
Alumni of Trinity College Dublin
People from County Mayo